Statistics of the V-League in the 2000–01 season.

Standings

References
 2000–01 V-League at RSSSF

Vietnamese Super League seasons
Vietnam
1
1